Rohrau may refer to:

 Rohrau, Austria, a town in Lower Austria
 Rohrau (Gärtringen), a village in the municipality of Gärtringen, Baden-Württemberg

See also
 Count Friedrich August von Harrach-Rohrau